René Nielsen (born 13 June 1967) is a Paralympic former athlete from Denmark competing mainly in category P56 pentathlon events. He now works as an ambassador and has worked as a mental coach in the Danish Superliga.

He competed in the 2000 Summer Paralympics in Sydney, Australia. There he won a gold medal in the men's javelin throw F56, a silver medal in the men's shot put F56 and a bronze medal in the men's pentathlon P58. He also competed at the 2004 Summer Paralympics in Athens, Greece. There he won a bronze medal in the men's Pentathlon P54-58, a bronze medal in the men's shot put F56 and finished fourth in the men's javelin throw F55-56.

Nielsen lost both of his legs in a train accident in 1991. His autobiography Half a Man - A Whole Person is a bestseller in Denmark selling 50,000 copies.

References

External links
 

1967 births
Paralympic athletes of Denmark
Athletes (track and field) at the 2000 Summer Paralympics
Athletes (track and field) at the 2004 Summer Paralympics
Paralympic gold medalists for Denmark
Paralympic silver medalists for Denmark
Paralympic bronze medalists for Denmark
Living people
Medalists at the 2000 Summer Paralympics
Medalists at the 2004 Summer Paralympics
Paralympic medalists in athletics (track and field)
Danish male shot putters
Danish male javelin throwers
Wheelchair shot putters
Wheelchair javelin throwers
Paralympic shot putters
Paralympic javelin throwers
Danish male writers